Bataan's 1st congressional district is one of the three congressional districts of the Philippines in the province of Bataan. It has been represented in the House of Representatives since 1987. The district consists of municipalities in northern Bataan, namely Abucay, Dinalupihan, Hermosa, Morong, Orani and Samal. It is currently represented in the 18th Congress by Geraldine Roman of the Lakas–CMD.

Representation history

Election results

2022

2019

2016

2013

2010

See also
Legislative districts of Bataan

References

Congressional districts of the Philippines
Politics of Bataan
1987 establishments in the Philippines
Congressional districts of Central Luzon
Constituencies established in 1987